Linc Mitchel Darner (born December 12, 1970) is an American basketball coach and former men's basketball coach of the University of Wisconsin–Green Bay Phoenix. Darner previously spent nine seasons as the head coach at DII Florida Southern College and four seasons at Saint Joseph's College (Indiana). In 2015, Darner's Florida Southern Moccasins finished 36–1 and won the NCAA Division II National Championship. Darner was named the 2015 NABC UPS DII National Coach of the Year.

Darner took over at Green Bay after Brian Wardle left in 2015. In his first season, he led the Phoenix to their first NCAA Tournament appearance since 1996. Darner was fired on May 17, 2020, after posting a 17–16 record in 2019–20.

Playing career
Darner played high school basketball at Highland High School in Anderson, Indiana. He then went on to Purdue University, where he played four years under legendary Boilermakers head coach Gene Keady. Darner was named team captain as a senior in 1993–94, leading the Boilers to a Big Ten Conference championship and a trip to the Elite Eight.

Personal life
Darner received his bachelor's degree in management from Purdue University in 1995. He and his wife, Kristen, have one daughter, Layne, and one son, Tate. Linc is the son of Alan and Diane Darner. He has two sisters and a brother. His older sisters are named Amy and Kim. Kim played college basketball at Indiana State. Linc's younger brother Tige was also an Indiana All-Star and played collegiate ball at Appalachian State. Linc is the uncle of Sean McDermott, who is currently on the Memphis Hustle roster.

Head coaching record

References

1970 births
Living people
American men's basketball coaches
American men's basketball players
Ashland Eagles men's basketball coaches
Basketball coaches from Ohio
Basketball players from Ohio
College men's basketball head coaches in the United States
Florida Southern Moccasins men's basketball coaches
Green Bay Phoenix men's basketball coaches
Lincoln Memorial Railsplitters men's basketball coaches
Murray State Racers men's basketball coaches
People from Ravenna, Ohio
Purdue Boilermakers men's basketball players
Saint Joseph's Pumas men's basketball coaches